Cloud Chamber is an American video game developer based in Novato, California, with a studio in Montréal, Québec. Founded by Kelley Gilmore on December 9, 2019, as a division of 2K (a publishing label of Take-Two Interactive Software), the company is developing the next entry in the BioShock series.

History 
On December 9, 2019, 2K announced that they had set a new studio in Novato, California and Montréal, Québec, led by Kelley Gilmore, former executive producer for Firaxis Games. Cloud Chamber will work on a new BioShock game. Several members that were part of the original BioShock game are part of the studio, including Hoagy de la Plante, Scott Sinclair, and Jonathan Pelling. Kelley said the focus of their studio is to "create yet-to-be-discovered worlds – and their stories within – that push the boundaries of what is possible in the video game medium".

Games developed

References

External links 
 

2019 establishments in California
2K (company)
American companies established in 2019
BioShock (series)
Companies based in Marin County, California
Novato, California
Software companies based in the San Francisco Bay Area
Take-Two Interactive divisions and subsidiaries
Video game companies based in California
Video game companies established in 2019
Video game development companies